Shemursha is the name of two rural localities in Russia:
Shemursha, Chuvash Republic, a selo in the Chuvash Republic
Shemursha, Ulyanovsk Oblast, a selo in Ulyanovsk Oblast